Buddy Steps Out is an American animated short film, released by Warner Bros. on July 20, 1935. It is a Looney Tunes cartoon, featuring Buddy, the second star of the series. It was supervised by Jack King, and musical direction was by Bernard Brown. Notably, Chuck Jones and Bob Clampett are credited animators for the short.

The film marks the final appearance of Cookie in an animated short. She was Buddy's girlfriend and main supporting character.

Summary
Cookie looks in a mirror, readying herself for the arrival of Buddy. She calls her canary out of its cage and together they sing "About a Quarter to Nine". The doorbell rings and Cookie returns her bird to its place. Buddy is at the door, dressed for the cold weather and snow. He doffs his hat, Cookie welcomes him in. With Buddy's assistance, Cookie puts on her coat, and the happy couple steps out. Just as soon as Buddy and Cookie have gone, the canary flies out of its cage and out of the open window, chirping merrily in the cold air until a mighty bluster blows it back.

The same cold wind blows into Cookie's home; by the window, on a dresser stands a framed picture of Buddy. Fantastically, the gust disturbs the figure in the photograph, prompting him to attempt to close the window. The Buddy-figure reaches the window by opening a nearby book as a bridge. But the photographic figure (hereinafter referred to simply as Buddy) can not close the window. As he holds the handle, Buddy is left to flail helplessly in the wind when another gust penetrates the house. "Help! Help!" he calls. Cookie's statue of Atlas comes to life, drops his globe, and comes to the rescue, taking Buddy down from the handle, closing the window, and placing Buddy back in his picture frame. Buddy thanks Atlas, picks up his hat (blown off by the wind), and returns to his proper position.

But the little canary is still outside! It pecks on the window until heard by Buddy, who awakens again to try the same technique he attempted before. The book as a bridge, he goes to the window, but instead now requires help in order to open it. He calls for Atlas, who, having changed his original position, again releases his globe and goes over to help Buddy. Atlas removes Buddy from the window and opens it. Buddy briefly steps out to fetch the freezing bird. Once inside again, Buddy dusts the snow from the poor creature's back whilst Atlas closes the window. By means of a series of pulleys on window blinds and a luminaire, Buddy hurries the canary to a small dish held aloft by a statuette, under which he places a cigarette lighter, whose heat melts the ice block around the bird's feet. Now sitting in a pool of water, the canary sneezes, splashing its rescuer, who then enjoins the bird to blow its nose. Feeling quite chipper again, the bird thanks Buddy by means of a kiss, then flits about the room, eventually turning on the radio.

And thus we have a reprise of "About a Quarter to Nine." Buddy dances, and everything comes to life: the joker in a deck of playing cards, the little girl on a can of "Gamble's soup," the pig depicted on a special ham in the icebox. An insect, rowing through the sink, ends the musical number by singing "Avalon". The insect gets sprayed by a soldier on the surface of a can of insect spray. The insect falls in the water and takes a box of suds with him, singing "I'm Forever Blowing Bubbles." The alarm clock sees the real Buddy and Cookie walking towards the house, and rings to signal that every object ought to return to its place, including the picture of Buddy. Cookie unlocks the door and steps inside, bidding her sweetheart good night: Buddy kisses her hand and bids her the same. Remarking "Isn't he a dear?," Cookie takes the framed photograph and kisses it repeatedly, leaving the picture of Buddy to wink at us in conclusion.

That's All Folks!
At cartoon's end, Beans the Cat delivers the valedictory "That's all, folks!," whereas in most earlier shorts featuring Buddy, Buddy himself bade the audience good-bye. For more on this, see the relevant section of the article on Buddy's Bug Hunt.

References

External links
 
 

1935 films
1935 animated films
1930s American animated films
1930s animated short films
American black-and-white films
Films scored by Bernard B. Brown
Films scored by Norman Spencer (composer)
Films based on classical mythology
Films directed by Jack King
Buddy (Looney Tunes) films
Looney Tunes shorts